Nemognatha lutea is a species of blister beetle in the family Meloidae. It is found in North America.

Subspecies
These three subspecies belong to the species Nemognatha lutea:
 Nemognatha lutea dichroa LeConte, 1853
 Nemognatha lutea dubia LeConte, 1853
 Nemognatha lutea lutea LeConte, 1853

References

Further reading

External links

 

Meloidae
Articles created by Qbugbot
Beetles described in 1853